The Legislative Assembly of Manitoba is the deliberative assembly of the Manitoba Legislature in the Canadian province of Manitoba. Fifty-seven members are elected to this assembly at provincial general elections, all in single-member constituencies with first-past-the-post voting. Bills passed by the Legislative Assembly are given royal assent by the King of Canada in Right of Manitoba, represented by the lieutenant governor of Manitoba. The Manitoba Legislative Building is located in central Winnipeg.

The premier of Manitoba is Heather Stefanson and the current speaker of the Legislative Assembly of Manitoba is Myrna Driedger; both of whom belong to the Progressive Conservative Party.

Historically, the Legislature of Manitoba had another chamber, the Legislative Council of Manitoba, but this was abolished in 1876, just six years after the province was formed.

Current members
 Members in bold are in the Cabinet of Manitoba
 Party leaders are italicized
 † Speaker of the Assembly

Seating plan

The seating arrangement is viewable at the official website.

References

External links 

Manitoba Legislative Assembly official YouTube channel
 Official site
 Legislative tour

Politics of Manitoba
Manitoaba
Manitoba
1870 establishments in Manitoba